Ancistropsylla is a genus of insects belonging to the monotypic family Ancistropsyllidae.

Species:

Ancistropsylla nepalensis 
Ancistropsylla roubaudi 
Ancistropsylla siamensis

References

Fleas
Siphonaptera genera